Golden Triangle may refer to:

Places

Asia
 Golden Triangle (Southeast Asia), named for its opium production
 Golden Triangle (Yangtze), China, named for its rapid economic development
 Golden Triangle (India), comprising the popular tourist spots Delhi, Agra and Jaipur
 Golden Triangle of Jakarta, the main central business district of Jakarta, Indonesia
 Golden Triangle (Kuala Lumpur), a commercial quarter in Kuala Lumpur, Malaysia; see Malaysia Airlines
 Minnan Golden Triangle, economic production area in the Fujian province of China, includes Xiamen, Quanzhou and Zhangzhou
 Liaoning, nickname Golden Triangle, in northeastern China

Europe
 Golden Triangle (Algarve), an affluent tourist area in the Algarve, Portugal
 Golden Triangle (Finland), an informal area between the cities of Helsinki, Turku, and Tampere
 Golden Triangle of Art, formed by three prominent museums in Madrid, Spain

United Kingdom
 Golden Triangle (Cheshire), named for its affluence
 Golden Triangle, an affluent area in the Epping Forest district between Chigwell, Loughton and Buckhurst Hill, Essex, UK
 Golden Triangle (Norwich), a popular, affluent residential quarter
 Golden Triangle (Yorkshire), the wealthy property triangle of North Leeds, Harrogate and York
 Golden triangle (universities), informal grouping of research universities in south east England
 Golden logistics triangle, a section of the English Midlands with good connectivity to the rest of the country

North America

Canada
 Golden Triangle (cycling route), named for the town of Golden, British Columbia, which forms one point
 Golden Triangle, Ottawa, named for the property triangle in Ottawa between Elgin Street and the Rideau Canal

Mexico
 Golden Triangle, a region in the Mexican north-west controlled by the infamous Sinaloa Cartel

United States
in order of state then city
 Golden Triangle (Rocky Mountains), a fly fishing area in the Montana/Wyoming/Idaho region
 Golden Triangle (California), part of the airspace at Edwards Air Force Base
 Golden Triangle, the central business district of Beverly Hills, California
 Golden Triangle, San Diego, or University City
 Golden Triangle, in Saratoga, California
 Golden Triangle, Denver, an informal name for a downtown Denver neighborhood in Colorado
 Golden Triangle (Kentucky), the area outlined by Lexington, Louisville and Northern Kentucky
 Golden Triangle (Massachusetts), a retail district
 Golden Triangle (Mississippi), the area outlined by Columbus, Starkville, and West Point
 Golden Triangle Regional Airport, Mississippi
 Golden Triangle, New Jersey, an unincorporated community
 Golden Triangle (New Hampshire), the area outlined by Manchester, Nashua and Salem
 Golden Triangle (Pittsburgh), Pennsylvania, the wedge-shaped central business district formed by the Allegheny and Monongahela Rivers
 Golden Triangle (Texas), the area outlined by Beaumont, Port Arthur, and Orange
 Golden Triangle Mall, Denton, Texas
 Golden Triangle (Washington, D.C.), a neighborhood and business improvement district
 Golden Triangle (Wisconsin), the area along the Chippewa and Eau Claire Rivers

Australia
 Golden Triangle, nickname for an area in the Brisbane central business district
 Golden Triangle (New South Wales), agricultural region bounded roughly by the towns of Narrabri, Moree, and Inverell
 Golden Triangle, nickname for the Goldfields region of Victoria
 Golden Triangle, nickname for the  Western Suburbs of Perth

Arts and entertainment
 Golden Triangles, another name for the Triforce in the Universe of The Legend of Zelda series of video games
 "Golden Triangle", a song by Jolin Tsai from the 2007 album Agent J
 "The Golden Triangle", an episode of the action-adventure television series MacGyver

Other uses
 Golden triangle (composition), a rule of thumb for composition in photographs or paintings
 Golden triangle (mathematics), an isosceles triangle whose sides are in the golden ratio
 Kimberling's golden triangle,  Clark Kimberling's extension of the golden ratio
 Golden Triangle (train), a train operated by the Pennsylvania Railroad; see List of rail accidents (1930–49)
 Golden Triangle, a named frequency of the PATrain commuter rail service

See also

 Gold triangles (Hypsopygia costalis), the clover hay moth